The year 1797 in science and technology involved some significant events.

Chemistry
 Smithson Tennant demonstrates that diamond is a pure form of carbon.
 Louis Nicolas Vauquelin discovers chromium.
 Joseph Proust proposes the law of definite proportions, which states that elements always combine in small, whole number ratios to form compounds.

Mathematics
 Lagrange publishes his Théorie des fonctions analytiques.

Physics
 Giovanni Battista Venturi describes the Venturi effect.

Technology

Zoology
 Thomas Bewick publishes the first volume, Land Birds, of his History of British Birds.

Awards
 Copley Medal: Not awarded

Births

 January 3 – Frederick William Hope, British zoologist (died 1862)
 January 4 – Wilhelm Beer, Prussian astronomer (died 1850)
 February – Joseph-Alphonse Adhémar, French mathematician (died 1862)
 February 2 – Joseph Guislain, Flemish psychiatrist (died 1860)
 February 5 – Jean-Marie Duhamel, French mathematician and physicist (died 1872)
 March 10 – George Poulett Scrope, British geologist and economist (died 1876)
 March 21 – Johann Andreas Wagner, German paleontologist, zoologist and archeologist (died 1861)
 April 29 – George Don, Scottish botanist (died 1856)
 May 2 – Abraham Gesner, Canadian inventor of kerosene (died 1864)
 May 30 – Karl Friedrich Naumann, German geologist and mineralogist (died 1873)
 July 14 – James Scott Bowerbank, British naturalist, geologist and paleontologist (died 1877)
 July 26 – William Hutton, British geologist and paleontologist (died 1860)
 August 23 – Adhémar Jean Claude Barré de Saint-Venant, French mechanician and mathematician (died 1886)
 August 31 – James Ferguson, Scottish-born American astronomer (died 1867)
 September 1 – Augustin-Pierre Dubrunfaut, French chemist (died 1881)
 September 10 – Carl Gustaf Mosander, Swedish chemist (died 1858)
 September 17 – Heinrich Kuhl, German zoologist (died 1821)
 October 4 – Félix Savary, French astronomer (died 1841)
 October 5 – John Gardner Wilkinson, British egyptologist (died 1875)
 November 14 – Charles Lyell, Scottish geologist (died 1875)
 November 20 - Mary Buckland, British paleontologist and marine biologist (died 1857)
 December 3
 Margaretta Morris, American entomologist  (died 1867)
 Andrew Smith, Scottish military surgeon, explorer, ethnologist and zoologist (died 1872)
 December 17 – Joseph Henry, American scientist (died 1878)
 December 23 – Adrien-Henri de Jussieu, French botanist (died 1853)

Deaths
 March 16 – Cristina Roccati, Italian scholar in physics (born 1732)
 March 26 – James Hutton, Scottish geologist (born 1726)
 June 13 – Samuel-Auguste Tissot, Swiss physician (born 1728)
 August 29 – Joseph Wright, English painter of scientific subjects (born 1734)
 date unknown  – Wang Zhenyi, Chinese Qing dynasty female astronomer and poet (born 1768)

References

 
18th century in science
1790s in science